A Date with Judy is an American situation comedy television series, two versions of which were broadcast on ABC between 1951 and 1953. A daytime version ran on weekly on Saturdays from June 2, 1951 to February 23, 1952. A primetime version with a different cast ran from July 10, 1952 to September 30, 1953.

Premise
The title character was teenager Judy Foster. The book Television Series of the 1950s: Essential Facts and Quirky Details described Foster as "a very pretty girl who is called 'the cutest date in town'", adding, "Judy has a knack for finding mischief and has a firm belief that her family doesn't understand her." The Encyclopedia of Television Shows, 1925 through 2010 described her as "bright, enthusiastic and 'blessed' with a knack for finding trouble." Judy's parents were Melvyn and Dora Foster, and she had a 12-year-old brother, Randolph. Her boyfriend was Oogie Pringle.

The program was derived from the radio show of the same name.

Cast
The table below shows the actors who portrayed the main characters in the two versions of the program.

Source: Total Television

Broadcast
The daytime version ran on Saturdays from 11:30 a.m. to noon, Eastern Daylight Time. The primetime version ran on Thursdays from 8 to 8:30 p.m. (July 1952 - October 1952) and then on Wednesdays from 7:30 to 8 p.m. (June 1953 - September 1953).

The primetime version was replaced by Saber of London, which had been on ABC on a different night the previous season.

Clorets sponsored the program.

Reception
In the trade publication Billboard, a review of the first daytime episode described A Date with Judy as "a mildly diverting situation comedy aimed at teenagers". Reviewer Leon Morse wrote that the program was cast well, but the script needed improvement.

References

External links
 

1951 American television series debuts
1953 American television series endings
1950s American sitcoms
Television shows set in the United States
English-language television shows
Television series based on radio series